"We Made It" is a single by rapper Busta Rhymes featuring American rock band Linkin Park. The song was to be on Busta Rhymes's eighth studio album, Back on My B.S., but was then cancelled off the track list because the album was released on a different label as "We Made It" was Busta Rhymes's last song on Interscope. The song was produced by Cool & Dre, with additional production by Linkin Park's Mike Shinoda and Brad Delson. The song was released on April 29, 2008. It was Busta Rhymes's final release on Aftermath Entertainment.

The track debuted and peaked on the Billboard Hot 100 charts at number 65. The song reach to the number 10 on the UK Singles Chart, becoming Rhymes' 11th and Linkin Park's 5th top 10 hit in the United Kingdom and their last to do it. The single peaked at number 10 and remained there after the physical release. The single also had significant success in Germany peaking at number 11 on the German Singles Chart.

Background
Busta Rhymes said that the inspiration for this song was from what happened to T.I. after the BET Awards: 

Dre originally sang the hook, until Rhymes listened to the beat and Linkin Park kept "popping up in his head".

The song was first performed on May 2, 2008, during Busta's concert at Club Index in Germany. However, he was more or less introducing the song to them, as the studio version was played and Busta occasionally sang over the song, or lip synced to it while holding his microphone down. The first performance with Linkin Park was at their rehearsal studio Third Encore on May 25, 2008, to an audience of 14 members of the Linkin Park fan club who were brought there by surprise. During the Projekt Revolution 2008 tour the song's performance featured Adam Monroe of Ashes Divide on the keyboard and Spliff Star on backing vocals and was played during Linkin Park's set. During Busta Rhymes' concerts, where Linkin Park isn't present, the studio instrumental is played and Busta usually tells the audience to move their arms up and down during Mike Shinoda's verse.

The song appears on the soundtrack of Madden NFL 09 and it is used as the theme song for its coverage of the 2008 NBA Western Conference Finals. This marked the second time a Shinoda song was used during the NBA play-offs, the first being "Remember the Name" by Fort Minor. The song was also used in the 2008 Philadelphia Phillies home World Series game before the team took the field in Games 3, 4, and 5 and as part of a video reel of highlights for the team leading up to the World Series, with a road in the background as the team took their playoff run "on the road".

Upon watching Barack Obama's 2008 Presidential election victory, Busta began cheering and singing the chorus of "We Made It".

Chamillionaire created his own version of the song called "The Real Thang" with a similar theme. The song is available on his Mixtape Messiah 4.

Music video
The music video premiered all day on BET on Tuesday, April 29, the same day as the video for its first single, "Don't Touch Me (Throw da Water on 'em)." The video also premiered for 24 hours only on Yahoo! Music on April 29. That same day, "We Made It" went to radio stations worldwide. The video also featured cameo appearances from Styles of Beyond, Bishop Lamont and Lamar Odom. Chris Robinson directed the video. * The warehouse in which the parts of the music video was filmed is the same location at which Linkin Park's Meteora album artwork and album cover were done. The video starts with the credits saying Busta Rhymes and Linkin Park and then the titles We Made It appear on the screen. Then you see Linkin Park walking through the warehouse and Busta Rhymes in a New York City flat. Then it cuts to scenes of people walking through the streets and people running a race through the rain.

This video also marks one of the first appearances of the Beats audio headphones.

As of July 2021, the song has 42 million views on YouTube.

Track listing

Personnel
 Busta Rhymes – rapping
 Eddie "Crack Keys" Montilla – keyboards
 Cool & Dre – all other instruments
 Neil Pogue – mixing engineer
 Gina Victoria and Rande Johnson – recording engineers
Linkin Park
 Chester Bennington – vocals
 Mike Shinoda – rapping, guitar
 Brad Delson – guitar

Charts

Weekly charts

Year-end charts

References

2008 songs
2008 singles
Busta Rhymes songs
Linkin Park songs
Songs written by Mike Shinoda
Music videos directed by Chris Robinson (director)
Song recordings produced by Cool & Dre
Songs written by Busta Rhymes
Alternative hip hop songs
Songs written by Cool (record producer)
Aftermath Entertainment singles
Interscope Records singles
Songs written by Dre (record producer)